Abda is a village in Győr-Moson-Sopron county, Hungary.

Etymology
The name comes from Slavic languages *ob(v)oda — literally "a place around which water flows". See i.e. similar Slavic names Obod, Obodnik, Obodnica (Serbo-Croatian language area) or Obodno (Poland).

References

External links 
 Street map 
 Aerial photographs of Abda

Populated places in Győr-Moson-Sopron County